1-acylglycerol-3-phosphate O-acyltransferase ABHD5 is an enzyme that in humans is encoded by the ABHD5 gene.

Function 

The protein encoded by this gene belongs to a large family of proteins defined by an alpha/beta hydrolase fold, and contains three sequence motifs that correspond to a catalytic triad found in the esterase/lipase/thioesterase subfamily. It differs from other members of this subfamily in that its putative catalytic triad contains an asparagine instead of the serine residue. Mutations in this gene have been associated with Chanarin-Dorfman syndrome, a triglyceride storage disease with impaired long-chain fatty acid oxidation.

Model organisms

Model organisms have been used in the study of ABHD5 function. A conditional knockout mouse line, called Abhd5tm1a(KOMP)Wtsi was generated as part of the International Knockout Mouse Consortium program — a high-throughput mutagenesis project to generate and distribute animal models of disease to interested scientists — at the Wellcome Trust Sanger Institute.

Male and female animals underwent a standardized phenotypic screen to determine the effects of deletion. Twenty three tests were carried out on mutant mice but no significant abnormalities were observed.

References

External links

Further reading 

 
 
 
 
 
 
 
 

Genes mutated in mice